Johnny Mark (born June 1, 1992) is a Canadian football kicker who played for the Saskatchewan Roughriders of the Canadian Football League (2014, 2016) and the Calgary Dinos in the Canadian Interuniversity Sport (CIS) from 2011 to 2015.  He concluded his university career holding multiple CIS records, including most points in a career (535), most field goals in a career (91) and most field goals in a season (26) and is a four-time CIS All-Canadian.  He was drafted in the third round, 20th overall by the Saskatchewan Roughriders in the 2014 CFL Draft.

Following the 2014 CFL Draft, Mark signed with the Saskatchewan Roughriders of the Canadian Football League. After playing in two games, he returned to the Calgary Dinos for the 2014 CIS season. Following the season he was traded to the Ottawa Redblacks, before being released on June 20, 2015 and returning for his final season at the University of Calgary in 2015. Mark was re-signed by the Saskatchewan Roughriders on August 2, 2016 and played Week 7 against the Calgary Stampeders.

He is now a Nuclear Professional at Canada's largest nuclear facility.
Transition from splitting the uprights to splitting atoms

References 

Canadian football placekickers
1992 births
Living people
University of Calgary alumni